Robert William Clark (August 22, 1897 – May 18, 1944) was a Major League Baseball pitcher who played for two seasons. He played for the Cleveland Indians from 1920 to 1921.

External links

1897 births
1944 deaths
Baseball players from Pennsylvania
Cleveland Indians players
Major League Baseball pitchers
Susquehanna River Hawks baseball players
People from Newport, Pennsylvania